A Boiling liquid expanding vapor explosion (BLEVE) is an explosion caused by the rupture of a vessel containing a pressurized liquid that has reached a temperature above its boiling point. Because the boiling point of a liquid rises with pressure, the contents of the pressurized vessel can remain a liquid as long as the vessel is intact. If the vessel's integrity is compromised, the loss of pressure drops the boiling point, which can cause the liquid to rapidly convert to a gas  expanding rapidly. If the gas is combustible, as in the case with hydrocarbons and alcohols, further damage can be caused by the ensuing fire.

Mechanism
There are three key elements that cause a BLEVE.

 A substance in liquid form at a temperature above its normal atmospheric pressure boiling point.
 A containment vessel maintains the pressure that keeps the substance in liquid form.
 A sudden loss of containment that rapidly drops the pressure.

Typically, a BLEVE starts with a container of liquid which is held above its normal, atmospheric pressure boiling temperature. Many substances normally stored as liquids, such as CO2, propane, and other similar industrial gases have boiling temperatures far below room temperature when at atmospheric pressure. In the case of water, a BLEVE could occur if a pressurized chamber of water is heated far beyond the standard . That container, because the boiling water pressurizes it, must be capable of holding liquid water at very high temperatures.

If the pressurized vessel, containing liquid at high temperature (which may be room temperature, depending on the substance) ruptures, the pressure which prevents the liquid from boiling is lost. If the rupture is catastrophic, where the vessel is immediately no longer capable of holding any pressure, then there suddenly exists a large mass of liquid which is at a very high temperature and very low pressure. This causes a portion of the liquid to "instantaneously" boil, which in turn causes an extremely rapid expansion. Depending on temperatures, pressures and the substance involved, that expansion may be so rapid that it can be classified as an explosion, fully capable of inflicting severe damage on its surroundings.

Water example

If the tank containing the water were to rupture, there would for a brief moment exist a volume of liquid water which would be at:
 Atmospheric pressure
At that moment, the water would boil and turn to vapour explosively, and the  liquid water turned to gas would take up significantly more volume (≈1,600-fold) than it did as liquid, causing a vapour explosion. Such explosions can happen when the superheated water of a boiler escapes through a crack in a boiler, causing a boiler explosion.

BLEVEs without chemical reactions

A BLEVE does not have to be a chemical explosion, nor does there need to be a fire: however, if a flammable substance is subject to a BLEVE, it may also be subject to intense heating, either from an external source of heat which may have caused the vessel to rupture in the first place, or from an internal source of localized heating such as skin friction. This heating can cause a flammable substance to ignite, adding a secondary explosion caused by the primary BLEVE. While the blast effects of any BLEVE can be devastating, a flammable substance such as propane can add significantly to the danger.

While the term BLEVE is most often used to describe the results of a container of flammable liquid rupturing due to fire, a BLEVE can occur even with a non-flammable substance such as water, liquid nitrogen, liquid helium or other refrigerants or cryogenics, and therefore is not usually considered a type of chemical explosion. Note that in the case of liquefied gasses, BLEVEs can also be hazardous because of rapid cooling due to the absorption of the enthalpy of vapourization (e.g. frostbites), or because of possible asphyxiation if a large volume of gas is produced and not rapidly dispersed (e.g. inside a building, or in a trough in the case of heavier-than-air gasses), or because of the toxicity of the gasses produced.

Fires
BLEVEs can be caused by an external fire near the storage vessel causing heating of the contents and pressure build-up. While tanks are often designed to withstand great pressure, constant heating can cause the metal to weaken and eventually fail. If the tank is being heated in an area where there is no liquid, it may rupture faster without the liquid absorbing the heat. Gas containers are usually equipped with relief valves that vent off excess pressure, but the tank can still fail if the pressure is not released quickly enough. Relief valves are sized to release pressure fast enough to prevent the pressure from increasing beyond the strength of the vessel, but not so fast as to be the cause of an explosion. An appropriately sized relief valve will allow the liquid inside to boil slowly, maintaining a constant pressure in the vessel until all the liquid has boiled and the vessel empties.

If the substance involved is flammable, it is likely that the resulting cloud of the substance will ignite after the BLEVE has occurred, forming a fireball and possibly a fuel-air explosion. If the materials are toxic, a large area will be contaminated.

Incidents
The term "BLEVE" was coined by three researchers at the Factory Mutual insurance company, in the analysis of an accident at one of their research facilities in 1957 involving a chemical reactor vessel.

On 18 August 1959, the Kansas City Fire Department suffered its second largest loss of life in the line of duty, when a 25,000 gallon (95,000 liters) gasoline tank exploded during a fire on Southwest Boulevard, killing 5 firefighters.

Examples of other BLEVE incidents have included:
 28 June 1959: Meldrim Trestle Disaster in Meldrim, Georgia US.
 28 March 1960: Cheapside Street whisky bond fire in Glasgow, Scotland.
 4 January 1966: Feyzin disaster; The explosion of an LPG storage tank near Feyzin, France.
 21 June 1970: The explosion of a derailed propane tank car in Crescent City, Illinois.
 5 July 1973: Kingman explosion; An explosion of a burning propane tank car in Kingman, Arizona.
 12 February 1974: Oneonta Explosion; A 122-car Delaware and Hudson freight train derails four miles (6.4 km) north of Oneonta, New York. 54 people were injured when a propane car that had been punctured when the train derailed and two other propane tanker cars exploded due to BLEVE. One tank was found on the other side of the Susquehanna River.
 31 January 1978: rupture of a liquid nitrogen tank at an Air Products & Chemicals and Mobay Chemical Corporation facility in New Martinsville, West Virginia
 23 February 1978: Waverly, Tennessee, tank car explosion; a tank car carrying liquefied petroleum gas exploded as a result of a cleanup related to a train derailment.
 1 July 1978: The Los Alfaques disaster; an overloaded tanker truck carrying liquefied propylene exploded next to a camping site in Alcanar, Spain, resulting in 217 deaths.
 19 November 1984: A fire at a liquefied petroleum gas (LPG) tank farm triggers multiple BLEVEs in the San Juanico disaster at San Juan Ixhuatepec, near Mexico City.<ref>Pemex LPG Terminal, Mexico City, Mexico. 19th November 1984. (n.d.). Retrieved 2023-03-08</ref>
 23 December 1988: Memphis tanker truck disaster; a tank truck carrying propane ruptured, causing ignition of leaking gas; the tank was subsequently launched from the crash site and crashed into a nearby building.
 1 April 1990: Sydney, Australia; A near-disaster occurred when Boral's St. Peters facility experienced an LPG fuel tank explosion on the night of 1 April 1990. A fire broke out at about 9:00 p.m., burning for over nine hours. A 100-tonne LPG cylinder and many smaller tanks exploded. The 100-tonne tank was shot from its support structure and bounced along the ground, coming to rest in the Alexandria Canal next to the site. Evacuations involved around 3,000 people from the surrounding area, in a two km radius. There were no casualties.
 9 April 1998: Albert City, Iowa; Herrig Brothers Farm Propane Tank Explosion: an 18,000-gallon propane tank exploded at the Herrig Brothers farm in Albert City, Iowa. The explosion killed two volunteer firefighters and injured seven other emergency response personnel. Several buildings were also damaged by the blast.
 1 May 1999: Explosion of a propane tank truck near Kamena Vourla, Greece, resulting in 5 deaths.
 10 August 2008: Toronto propane explosion; multiple explosions at a propane facility in Toronto, Ontario.
 29 June 2009: Viareggio train derailment; 32 dead and 26 injured after the explosion of two tank railway wagons, derailed and loaded with LPG.
 3 April 2017: Semi-Closed Receiver, Condensate, BLEVE, Loy Lange Box Co, St Louis, Missouri.
 6 August 2018: Tanker truck explosion near an airport in Bologna, Italy.
 24 December 2022: Tanker truck explosion near a hospital in Boksburg, South Africa.

Safety measures
Some fire mitigation measures are listed under liquefied petroleum gas.

 Pressure relief valve
 Thermal barrier
 Water spray cooling
 Maintenance of pressure tanks to avoid damage or corrosion

Transport Canada published a training video for emergency response personnel to respond to and prevent BLEVEs. They also advise that expert advice can be obtained from Transport Canada's Canadian Transport Emergency Centre, CANUTEC.

See also
Boiler explosion
Deflagration
Expansion ratio
Explosive boiling or phase explosion
Gas carriers
Hydrogen safety
Lac-Mégantic rail disaster
PEPCON disaster
Rapid phase transition
Toronto propane explosion
Viareggio train derailment

References

External links

  – video of a controlled BLEVE demo
  – video of propane and isobutane BLEVEs from a train derailment at Murdock, Illinois (3 September 1983)
  – video of BLEVE from the Toronto propane depot fire
  – Dozens of LPG tanks BLEVEs after a road accident in Moscow
 Kingman, AZ BLEVE – An account of 5 July 1973 explosion in Kingman, with photographs
 Propane Tank Explosions – Description of circumstances required to cause a propane tank BLEVE.
 Analysis of BLEVE Events at DOE Sites – Details physics and mathematics of BLEVEs.
  HID – Safety Report Assessment Guide: Whisky Maturation Warehouses – The liquor is aged in wooden barrels that can suffer BLEVE.

Explosives
Firefighting
Fire
Types of fire
Gas technologies
Industrial fires and explosions